Juan Manuel Iturbe Arévalo (born 4 June 1993) is a Paraguayan professional footballer who plays as a forward for Greek Super League club Aris and the Paraguay national team.

Iturbe represented the Paraguay national team in a friendly match in 2009. After the friendly, he declared his intention to play for Argentina, his country of birth, and did so at under-20 level. However, in early 2016 Iturbe expressed his desire to once again represent Paraguay, his parents' country of origin.

Club career

Sportivo Trinidense
At the age of 12, Iturbe made his first-team debut for Sportivo Trinidense in the 2006 Paraguayan Division Intermedia. He scored his first goal for the club in the 35th minute of a 1–0 away victory against Choré Central on 7 May 2006. Sportivo Trinidense finished in second position of the Division Intermedia table and were promoted to the Primera División Paraguaya for the 2007 season.

Cerro Porteño
Iturbe debuted for Cerro Porteño on 28 June 2009 at the age of 16 in a game against Libertad, the 21st week of the Paraguayan Primera División.

Being 17 years of age, Iturbe was not under professional contract with Cerro Porteño, therefore, he trained with Quilmes of the Argentine Primera División. In January 2011, Iturbe confirmed he was signing with Portuguese club Porto and would join the team when he turned 18. After agreeing on the move, he returned to Cerro Porteño in February, where he remained until his 18th birthday in June. He scored a brace in his first Copa Libertadores game shortly after that.

Porto
On 10 December 2011, Iturbe made his debut for Porto, coming in added time in place of Hulk in a 2–1 Primeira Liga win at Beira-Mar, the first of four appearances off the bench in a title-winning season. On 3 November 2012, he scored his only goal in Portugal, the sole goal of the reserves' home win over their Marítimo equivalents.

It was confirmed on 29 December 2012 that Iturbe had joined River Plate on a six-month loan.

Hellas Verona
His impressive spell with River Plate helped Iturbe secure an initial loan move to Serie A club Hellas Verona where he thrived during the 2013–14 season, so much so he was signed permanently from Porto for €15 million in May 2014. Iturbe contributed eight goals and four assists to the newly-promoted club, helping them to a 10th place finish.

Roma
On 16 July 2014, just weeks after signing permanently for Verona, Serie A giants Roma announced the signing of Iturbe for €22 million with performance-based add-ons up to €2.5 million. The player signed a five-year contract, ending on 30 June 2019. Iturbe's first goal for Roma was against CSKA Moscow in the 2014–15 UEFA Champions League, which ended in a 5–1 victory. He also scored against Juventus and a vital goal in the Derby della Capitale against Lazio, which helped Roma to stay in second position and gave Roma a direct start in the Champions League in the next year.

AFC Bournemouth (loan)
On 1 January 2016, Iturbe joined Premier League side AFC Bournemouth on loan for the remainder of the 2015–16 season, making just two appearances.

Torino (loan)
On 4 January 2017, it was announced that Iturbe had joined Torino on loan with a buying option.

Tijuana (loan) and Pumas UNAM
On 21 August 2017, Iturbe was loaned to Liga MX side Club Tijuana until 30 June 2018. Due to "sporting targets" that were reached during the season, Tijuana had to make the transfer permanent. They then sent Iturbe to Pumas in a swap deal.

Aris
On 7 August 2021, Aris officially announced the signing of Iturbe on a two-year deal. 

Iturbe had to wait until February to score his first league goal, when he sealed a 3-0 home win against Atromitos.

International career
Having spent most of his life in Paraguay, Iturbe began his international career in the youth setup of Paraguay. In October 2009, he was called up to the Paraguay national team by coach Gerardo Martino at the age of 16 for a friendly against Chile in November. Iturbe was substituted onto the field in the 73rd minute of the match for Juan Rodrigo Rojas as Paraguay were defeated 2–1 on 4 November 2009.

As this had not been a competitive game, Iturbe was able to change allegiances if so wished. He later fell out with the management in Paraguay and declared his allegiance for Argentina.

In early 2016, however, Iturbe expressed his desire to once more represent Paraguay. On 8 March 2016, he was called up for the 2018 FIFA World Cup qualification matches against Ecuador and Brazil. He made his competitive debut with Paraguay on 29 March as a substitute in the second half of the match against Brazil, making him cap-tied to Paraguay. He was named to Paraguay's squad for the Copa América Centenario that summer.

Style of play
The media once dubbed Iturbe the "new Lionel Messi", given their many similarities: like Messi, Iturbe possesses a low centre of gravity, significant speed, and excellent close control, and has been described as "a left-footed, technically gifted Argentine – but nowadays representing Paraguay – forward of diminutive stature who is agile and quick on the ball and who possesses an eye for goal." A versatile, well-rounded, and creative attacking player, who is known for his ability to link up the midfield with the attack, he is capable of playing as a winger on either flank, in the centre as an attacking midfielder, or as a second striker, although his preferred role is as an outside forward on the right side of the pitch. He has also been used as a striker or centre-forward on occasion. Regarded as a promising young player, he is known in particular for his dribbling skills, pace, and powerful striking ability.

Career statistics

References

External links

Profile  at Argentina Football World

1993 births
Living people
Argentina under-20 international footballers
Argentina youth international footballers
Argentine emigrants to Paraguay
Argentine footballers
Argentine people of Basque descent
Argentine sportspeople of Paraguayan descent
Citizens of Paraguay through descent
Association football midfielders
Paraguay international footballers
Paraguayan expatriate footballers
Paraguayan expatriate sportspeople
Paraguayan expatriate sportspeople in England
Paraguayan expatriate sportspeople in Greece
Paraguayan expatriate sportspeople in Mexico
Paraguayan expatriate sportspeople in Portugal
Paraguayan expatriate sportspeople in Italy
Paraguayan footballers
Paraguayan people of Basque descent
Paraguayan Primera División players
Premier League players
Primeira Liga players
Serie A players
Liga MX players
Super League Greece players
Cerro Porteño players
Quilmes Atlético Club footballers
FC Porto players
Hellas Verona F.C. players
Club Atlético River Plate footballers
Footballers from Buenos Aires
A.S. Roma players
AFC Bournemouth players
Torino F.C. players
Club Tijuana footballers
C.F. Pachuca players
Club Universidad Nacional footballers
Aris Thessaloniki F.C. players
Expatriate footballers in Portugal
Expatriate footballers in Paraguay
Expatriate footballers in Italy
Expatriate footballers in England
Expatriate footballers in Mexico
Expatriate footballers in Greece
Argentine expatriate footballers
Argentine Primera División players
Argentine expatriate sportspeople in Paraguay
Argentine expatriate sportspeople in Italy
Argentine expatriate sportspeople in Portugal
Argentine expatriate sportspeople in England
Argentine expatriate sportspeople in Mexico
Copa América Centenario players
2019 Copa América players